Train Without a Timetable is a 1959 Yugoslav film directed by Veljko Bulajić. It was entered into the 1959 Cannes Film Festival. The film was also selected as the Yugoslav entry for the Best Foreign Language Film at the 32nd Academy Awards, but was not accepted as a nominee.

The film was a complex drama dealing with the interactions among people who were forcefully leaving their ancestral homes in order to move to new, yet undeveloped farmland. His debut was a major success earning him four awards at the Yugoslav National Film Awards (now known as the Pula Film Festival), an award from the city of Zagreb and the best debut film award at the Cannes Film Festival.

Cast
 Stole Aranđelović as Lovre
 Inge Ilin
 Olivera Marković as Ike
 Tana Mascarelli as Jole's wife
 Milan Milosevic
 Ivica Pajer
 Lia Rho-Barbieri
 Vjera Simić (as Vera Simić)
 Teddy Stotsek (as Tedy Sotosek)
 Zdenka Trach (as Zdenka Trah)
 Ljiljana Vajler
 Kruno Valentić as policeman
 Krešimir Zidarić
 Velimir Živojinović as Duje

See also
 List of submissions to the 32nd Academy Awards for Best Foreign Language Film
 List of Yugoslav submissions for the Academy Award for Best Foreign Language Film

References

External links

1959 films
Yugoslav drama films
Serbo-Croatian-language films
Yugoslav black-and-white films
Films directed by Veljko Bulajić
Jadran Film films
Rail transport films
Croatian black-and-white films
Films set in Vojvodina